{{DISPLAYTITLE:Ice Ih}}

Ice Ih (hexagonal ice crystal) (pronounced: ice one h, also known as ice-phase-one) is the hexagonal crystal form of ordinary ice, or frozen water. Virtually all ice in the biosphere is ice Ih, with the exception only of a small amount of ice Ic that is occasionally present in the upper atmosphere. Ice Ih exhibits many peculiar properties that are relevant to the existence of life and regulation of global climate. For a description of these properties, see Ice, which deals primarily with ice Ih.

The crystal structure is characterized by the oxygen atoms forming hexagonal symmetry with near tetrahedral bonding angles. Ice Ih is also stable under applied pressures of up to about  where it transitions into ice III or ice II.

Physical properties
The density of ice Ih is 0.917 g/cm3 which is less than that of liquid water. This is attributed to the presence of hydrogen bonds which causes atoms to become closer in the liquid phase. Because of this, ice Ih floats on water, which is highly unusual when compared to other materials. The solid phase of materials is usually more closely and neatly packed and has a higher density than the liquid phase. When lakes freeze, they do so only at the surface while the bottom of the lake remains near  because water is densest at this temperature. This anomalous behavior of water and ice is what allows fish to survive harsh winters.

The high latent heat of sublimation is principally indicative of the strength of the hydrogen bonds in the crystal lattice. The latent heat of melting is much smaller, partly because liquid water near 0 °C also contains a significant number of hydrogen bonds. The refractive index of ice Ih is 1.31.

Crystal structure

The accepted crystal structure of ordinary ice was first proposed by Linus Pauling in 1935. The structure of ice Ih is roughly one of crinkled planes composed of tessellating hexagonal rings, with an oxygen atom on each vertex, and the edges of the rings formed by hydrogen bonds. The planes alternate in an ABAB pattern, with B planes being reflections of the A planes along the same axes as the planes themselves. The distance between oxygen atoms along each bond is about 275 pm and is the same between any two bonded oxygen atoms in the lattice. The angle between bonds in the crystal lattice is very close to the tetrahedral angle of 109.5°, which is also quite close to the angle between hydrogen atoms in the water molecule (in the gas phase), which is 105°. This tetrahedral bonding angle of the water molecule essentially accounts for the unusually low density of the crystal lattice – it is beneficial for the lattice to be arranged with tetrahedral angles even though there is an energy penalty in the increased volume of the crystal lattice. As a result, the large hexagonal rings leave almost enough room for another water molecule to exist inside. This gives naturally occurring ice its rare property of being less dense than its liquid form. The tetrahedral-angled hydrogen-bonded hexagonal rings are also the mechanism that causes liquid water to be densest at 4 °C. Close to 0 °C, tiny hexagonal ice Ih-like lattices form in liquid water, with greater frequency closer to 0 °C.  This effect decreases the density of the water, causing it to be densest at 4 °C when the structures form infrequently.

Hydrogen disorder

The hydrogen atoms in the crystal lattice lie very nearly along the hydrogen bonds, and in such a way that each water molecule is preserved. This means that each oxygen atom in the lattice has two hydrogens adjacent to it, at about 101 pm along the 275 pm length of the bond. The crystal lattice allows a substantial amount of disorder in the positions of the hydrogen atoms frozen into the structure as it cools to absolute zero. As a result, the crystal structure contains some residual entropy inherent to the lattice and determined by the number of possible configurations of hydrogen positions that can be formed while still maintaining the requirement for each oxygen atom to have only two hydrogens in closest proximity, and each H-bond joining two oxygen atoms having only one hydrogen atom. This residual entropy S0 is equal to 3.5 J mol−1 K−1.

There are various ways of approximating this number from first principles. Suppose there are a given number N of water molecules. The oxygen atoms form a bipartite lattice: they can be divided into two sets, with all the neighbors of an oxygen atom from one set lying in the other set. Focus attention on the oxygen atoms in one set: there are N/2 of them. Each has four hydrogen bonds, with two hydrogens close to it and two far away. This means there are

allowed configurations of hydrogens for this oxygen atom. Thus, there are 6N/2 configurations that satisfy these N/2 atoms. But now, consider the remaining N/2 oxygen atoms: in general they won't be satisfied (i.e., they won't have precisely two hydrogen atoms near them). For each of those, there are

possible placements of the hydrogen atoms along their hydrogen bonds, of which six are allowed.  So, naively, we would expect the total number of configurations to be

Using Boltzmann's principle, we conclude that

where  is the Boltzmann constant, which yields a value of 3.37 J mol−1 K−1, a value very close to the measured value. This estimate is 'naive', as it assumes the six out of 16 hydrogen configurations for oxygen atoms in the second set can be independently chosen, which is false. More complex methods can be employed to better approximate the exact number of possible configurations, and achieve results closer to measured values.

By contrast, the structure of ice II is hydrogen-ordered, which helps to explain the entropy change of 3.22 J/mol when the crystal structure changes to that of ice I. Also, ice XI, an orthorhombic, hydrogen-ordered form of ice Ih, is considered the most stable form at low temperatures.

See also
 Ice, for other crystalline forms of ice

References

Further reading
 
 
 

Water ice